The Korona Kocich Gór is a one-day cycling race held in Poland. It was first held in 2013 and has been part of the UCI Europe Tour in category 1.2 since 2015.

Winners

References

Cycle races in Poland
2013 establishments in Poland
Recurring sporting events established in 2013
UCI Europe Tour races
Summer events in Poland